Andrew Feld (born 1961 in Cambridge, Massachusetts) is an American poet.

Life
He graduated from the University of Houston, with an MFA. Currently, he teaches at University of Washington, and is the editor of The Seattle Review. His work has appeared in AGNI, The Nation, New England Review, The Paris Review, Poetry, Triquarterly, The Virginia Quarterly Review, The Yale Review. Feld currently lives in Seattle, Washington.

Awards
 2003 National Poetry Series
 Wallace Stegner Fellowship from Stanford University
 "Discovery", The Nation Award

Works
 "Little Viral Song", Seattle Poetry Chain
 "On Fire", Virginia Quarterly Review, Spring 2002 
 "The Drunk Singer (II)", Virginia Quarterly Review, Spring 2002 
 "Quarters", Gulf Coast: A Journal of Literature and Fine Arts

Anthologies

References

1961 births
Living people
American male poets
Writers from Cambridge, Massachusetts
University of Houston alumni
University of Washington faculty
Writers from Seattle
21st-century American poets
21st-century American male writers